The Boy with a Moon on his Forehead is a Bengali folktale collected by Maive Stokes and Lal Behari Day.

These tales are classified in the Aarne-Thompson-Uther Index as tale type ATU 707, "The Three Golden Children". These tales refer to stories where a girl promises a king she will bear a child or children with wonderful attributes, but her jealous relatives or the king's wives plot against the babies and their mother.

Summary

Stokes's version
In Maive Stokes's version, later republished by folklorist Joseph Jacobs, titled The Boy who had a Moon on his Forehead and a Star on his Chin, a gardener's daughter says out loud, to her friends' mockery, that when she marries the will give birth to a boy with a moon on the forehead and a star on the chin. Her friends think she is only jesting, but her words draw the king's attention, who makes her his fifth cowife.

A year later, the king's other four queens convince the newly crowned  one that the king may give her a kettle drum to inform the time of labour is approaching. The fifth queen sounds the kettle-drum three times to see if the king comes to her. He does on the first two occasions, but on the third he is absent, which creates a window of opportunity for the other queens to replace her son for a stone and deliver the baby to a nurse to kill him.

The nurse takes the boy in a box and buries it in the jungle, but the king's royal hound, named Shankar, goes to the hole and swallows the boy (but does not eat him). The dog takes the boy and rears him for a time. His master, the king's dogkeeper, sees the boy after the dog spits him out and marvels at the boy's beauty. The four queens learn that the boy is still alive and demand the dog to be killed come morning. The dog, however, saves the boy by giving him to the king's cow Suri, who swallows the boy in its belly.

The four queens once again learn of the boy's survival and order the cow to be sacrificed, but the boy is saved by the cow, who delivers him to the king's horse, Katar. The news of his survival reach the four queens' ears, who beg the king to sacrifice the horse. When a cadre of the king's sypoys surround the barn, the horse tells the prince to get some princely clothes, a bridle, a saddle, a sword and a gun from the stable, and ride it to escape execution.

The boy and Katar reach another country and exchange their clothes for common disguises, and the horse becomes a donkey. The prince with a moon takes up a job as a grain merchant's apprentice. On one hot day, the boy begins to sing to pass the time, and the local king's seventh daughter listens to the song. The princess goes to the royal garden, located neat the grain merchant's shop, and inquires the youth about his origins. He evades her questions. The princess insists on knowing about him, and this time he answers he is only a poor boy.

Some time later, the princess tells her father she wants to get married, and she must choose her husband. The king gathers a royal assemblage in the royal gardens, where the princess is to select her betrothed, and she chooses the grain merchant's apprentice. The princes and rajás protest her choice, but the king accepts his new son-in-law

After their marriage, the princess feels a bit saddened that her intended does not join with her sisters' husbands in hunting game around the palace. The prince consults with the magic horse Katar (shaped like a donkey), and they transform back into a gallant prince and a horse. The duo hunt birds and deers, and stop to rest under a tree. The other six brothers-in-law come and see him in the guise of the prince with a moon and a star, and beg him for food and drink. The prince agrees, so long as the six other men suffer a red-hot iron scar on their backs.

The prince returns to the palace in his true form, to everyone's surprise. He tells the truth to his wife, who accepts him as her husband. Some time later, the prince tells Katar he wants to return to his own country to check on his father and mother. The youth and the princess visit his father's kingdom.

After the couple arrive and pitch their tents, the king pays him a visit. The youth introduces himself as a foreign prince, who wants to hold a grand banquet for the king and the whole kingdom is to be invited. Everyone comes to the celebration, except his mother, the gardener's daughter. The youth insists she is to be present too at the event. The youth greets her as a queen, to the other queens's anger.

Some days after, the prince asks the king if he has any sons. The prince reveals the whole truth to his father, and shows him the magic horse Katar, who has helped the prince so far. The king asks his son to live with him in the palace, but he will only consent if his father kills the other four queens. The king does, and restores his former queen to her proper place.

Day's version
In another Bengali folk tale collected by Lal Behari Dey in his Folk-Tales of Bengal with the title The Boy with the Moon on his forehead, a king has not yet fathered a son, even though he has six cowives. So he decides to marry a seventh queen. In his wanderings, he finds a cow-dung seller's beautiful daughter. In a conversation with other girls (daughter of the king's minister, daughter of a wealthy merchant, and the daughter of the royal priest), she tells them that to whoever marries her, she will bear him a boy and a girl (the girl "divinely fair"; the boy with "the moon on his forehead and stars on the palms of his hands").

The king decides to marry the girl who promises the wonder children, to her mother's surprise and to the anger and jealousy of the other six queens. The king gives her a bell and tells her he will be travelling for the next six months. The other queens convince the girl to ring the bell to prove that the king will return to her side. After three times, the king grows impatient and will not returns after a fourth ringing.

The six queens take the seventh queen and a midwife to a hut in the stables, replace the twins for puppies and give them to be disposed by the midwife. She puts both babies in an earthenware pot and takes the vessel to a poor potter's wheel, so that he burns all vessels clays the next morning along with the infants. However, the potter and his wife wake up the next morning and discover the clay vessels have been prepared overnight. The couple also find the twins "of unearthly beauty" and raises them as their own children.

After the potter and his wife die, the twin children move to the king's city. When they enter a bazaar, the whole place illuminates all of a sudden. Fascinated by their beauty, the men at the bazaar promise to build a house for them, which they do. The boy hires a horse and hunts game in the nearby forests. One day, the king, also on a hunt, sees the mysterious boy. The youth shoots an arrow at a deer, but the force of the maneuver lets loose his turban, and the king can see his lunar birthmark.

The king returns to the six queens and tells them the incident, thinking about the son he might have had. The queens notice the youth is the boy they tried to kill in the past, and send the midwife to talk to both twins. The youth's sister is paid a visit by the midwife, who tells her her house need the kataki flower, guarded by 700 rakshasas.

The boy travels far across the ocean and finds a maiden named Pushpavati sleeping in a death-like state controlled by a golden and a silver baton. The maidens bids him to hide, as a rakshasa comes to wake up the girl. Pushpavati asks the demoness what may happen when she dies, and the creature answer that fate ordained that only the man with a moon on his forehead and stars on his palms can get a wooden box in a deep tank of water which contains the death of all rakshasas.

The boy follows the rakshasas' instructions, gets the wooden box, crushes the two bees that were inside and kill the demons. He takes a bunch of kataki flowers to his sister, along with the maiden. They return home safe and sound. One day, the youth invites the king to his house, where the whole truth is revealed by Lady Pushpavati. The king buries the six queens in the ground and reinstates the twins' mother to her rightful place.

Analysis

Tale type
Both tales are classified in the international Aarne-Thompson-Uther Index as ATU 707, "The Three Golden Children".

Late 19-century and early 20th-century scholarship noted the great similarities between the Bengali tales and European fairy tales with a similar narrative. Scholar Francis Hindes Groome already saw a parallel between this tale with the Romani tale he collected, and Brothers Grimm's The Three Little Birds.

In their commentaries to the Grimm's fairy tales, folklorists Johannes Bolte and Jiří Polívka listed the Indian tales as related to the German tale The Three Little Birds.

According to Stith Thompson' and Jonas Balys's index of Indian tales, the tale type ATU 707 shows 44 variants across Indian sources. Stuart Blackburn also studied Tamilian variants of the tale type, which he claimed was "one of the most frequently told Tamil tales". As for Stokes's version, it is also classified as type AaTh 532, "The Helpful Horse", in Stith Thompson and Warren Roberts's Types of Indic Oral Tales.

Motifs 
Folklorist Christine Goldberg, in the entry of the tale type in Enzyklopädie des Märchens, noted that in Indian variants of tale type 707, the children may entice their father to the truth by trying to feed a wooden horse. In others, the children die and are reborn as plants, and only their mother may pluck fruits or flowers from the trees. Likewise, researcher Noriko Mayeda and Indologist W. Norman Brown divided Indian variants of type 707 in five groups: (1) quest for wonderful items; (2) reincarnation into flowers; (3) use of wooden horses; (4) children sing a song; (5) miscellaneous.

Dutch author Christiaan Snouck Hurgronje noted that the motif of the hero branding his brothers-in-law (or other suitors) also occurs in Indonesian literature, namely, in Banta Ali or Banta Peureudan ("Prince Ape"), and in the Hikayat Indra Bangsawan.

Variants

Quest for objects
A similar tale is The Enchanted Bird, Music and Stream, recorded by Alice Elizabeth Dracott, in Simla Village Tales, or Folk Tales from the Himalayas. In this variant, the young queen gives birth to three siblings (two boys and a girl) and the sisters' agent only mentions the quest items without any significant description.

In a Bengali variant, Kiranmala or Kirunmala, or the Wreath of Light, the king wanders the streets at night to listen to his subjects' opinion of him, and stops by a house where three sisters are talking to one another: the first wanting to marry the feeder of the king's horses, the second to the royal cook, and the third to the king himself. The king brings them all to his presence the next day and marries the youngest. The new queen gives birth to two boys and a girl in three consecutive births, who are replaces by the sisters for a cur, a kitten and a doll. The children are thrown in the water in an earthen pot and saved by a brahmin. The brahmin names the boys Arun and Barun (Varun) and the girl Kirunmala. After he dies, the siblings meet the king after a heavy storm on the road, and decide to build a palace. One day, a fakir passes by their palace, compliments their fine abode, but suggests the girl to send her brothers for "a silver tree with flowers of gold, a tree of diamonds with birds of gold perched on it; and a canopy of a net made of pearls". In this tale, the water is only used to disenchant Kirunmala's petrified brothers, and one of the birds of gold convinces them to invite the king to a banquet.

In a Gujarati variant collected by Putlibai Wadia with the title Súrya and Chandra, a disguised raja wanders about his kingdom and reaches a tree near a well, where a group of young women were talking. Two of them boast about their skills, and a third, from a Brahman family, says she is destined to bear the Sun and the Moon. The king, interested in fathering both luminaries, marries the girl as his fourth wife. The woman bears twins: the Sun, a "divinely handsome boy", and the Moon, a "bewitchingly lovely girl". The other wives replace them for a log of wood and a broom and cast them in the sea. The queen is imrisoned and the twins are saved by a poor devotee, who named the boy Súrya and the girl Chandra. Years later, the girl is convinced to send her brothers for the sandalwood tree that lies at the bottom of the well of Chandan Pari, and the world-renowned Pari of Unchhatra, who petrifies people. Súrya brings home the sandalwood tree, and marries both Chandan Pari and Unchhatra. Unchhatra is the one to arrange for the truth of their parentage to be discovered.

In a variant from Rajasthan, The Pomegranate Princess, a childless king marries a seventh wife, a woman named Usha, to the jealousy of the other six queens. Now queen, Usha gives birth to a boy, a girl and another boy (as three consecutive births), but the jealous queens bribe the midwife to put rocks in their cribs and throw the children in the ocean. However, they are saved each time by a sadhu, who names them, respectively, Gokul, Kalama and Kalyan. Some time later, the sadhu dies, but leaves the children "the ashes of the fire", which are imbued with magic. The three decide to move from the sadhu's hut to the city, and Kamala, using the magic ashes, creates a fine mansion for them. The barber and the king's minister see Kamala and find a matchmaker. She takes a job as the sibling's housekeeper and tells the girl the house will be even more beautiful if one of her brothers finds a pomegranate that "shines like a bright star in a far away tree". Her brother Gokul uses the ashes on his horse, rides it to the tree and takes the pomegranate home. That night, the fruit cracks open and a princess comes out of it. The next time, the matchmaker convinces the sister to send her brothers for the golden bird. As usual, the brothers fail and are turned into stone, but their sister gets the bird and rescues them. Now back home, the golden bird convinces the siblings to invite the king, the queens and everyone for a banquet. The bird reveals the intrigue to the king, who orders for the former queen to be brought to his presence.

Ethnologist Verrier Elwin collected a Baiga story from the Mandla district, titled The Brave Children: the fourth queen gives birth to a boy and a girl, but the three jealous co-wives of the king cast them in the water. They are found by a Sadhu, who gives them two sticks with a magical command. Years later, the jealous queens send the boy on a quest for a lotus flower and Pathari Kaniya (The Stone Maiden) as his wife.

James Hinton Knowles collected three variants from Kashmir, grouped under the title "The Wicked Queens". In the first, the number of siblings is 4 (three boys, one girl), the third son is the hero and he goes on a quest for a bird that speaks and sings. In another, there is only one son who quests for a tree and its covering (lacking the quest for a magical water and a magical bird, from other variants).

Indian author Venkataswami published an Indian tale titled The Two Princes and Their Sister: a poor woman has three daughters. One day, a fairy, under the guise of an old woman, is welcomed by the youngest and kind third sister into their house. The fairy blesses their house and leaves. One night, the three sister talk to one another: the eldest promises she can weave a great sail for a vessel, if she maries a captain; the middle one promises to give birth to a boy if she marries a king; and the youngest promises to give birth to twins, a boy with a golden chain on his neck and a girl with two stars on the front if she marries a prince. Coincidentally, a ship's captain, a king and a prince just happen to pass by the house at the exact moment and overhear their conversation. The men take each of the sisters as their respective wives. Jealous of the luck of the younger ones, the eldest sister deceives the her brothers-in-law by replacing the king's son for a block and the prince's children for animals, and casting the babies in the water. The babies are saved by a country merchant and looked after by the fairy that visited their biological mothers years ago. When they are grown up, their aunt, the ship's captain's wife, sends them after the dancing-water, the singing apple and the singing bird that sings songs from "all climes and nationalities".

In a tale collected from the Lapcha people in Sikhim, The Golden Knife and the Silver Knife, King Lyang-bar-ung-bar-pono goes on a hunt with his two dogs. The dogs follow two stags. The animals turn into she-devils and kill the dogs. The king discovers their corpses and follow a trail into a second realm, Lung-da. He goes to the king's palace and meets two fairies: Se-lamen and Tung-lamen. Se-lamen spends a night with the king and promises to feed the entire palace with a grain of rice. Tung-lamen spends the next night with him and promises that she can clothe the king down to the poorest person with only one roll of cloth. The king Lyang-bar meets Ramit-pandi, the daughter of the king of Lung-da, who promises to give birth to a golden knife and a silver knife. They marry and Ramit-pandi gives birth to twins, who are replaced for puppies by the fairies. The evil fairies put the twins in an earthen pot and bury it deep in the ground at a crossroads. The twins' mother is killed, but her corpse floats upstream. The boys are found by a poor old couple. Years later, king Lyang-bar summons the twins to his presence to inquire them about their origins, and the evil fairies convince the king to send them after the golden and silver flutes of the demon Chenchhyo-byung-pono. The twins steal the flute and a pair of tusks and make peace with the demon, returning soon after to their father's kingdom to reveal the whole truth and to resuscitate their mother.

Noriko Mayeda and W. Norman Brown collected a tale from Jammu from an informant named Des Raj Chopra. In this tale, titled The Slandered Queen, Khalifa Haroun-al-Rashid wanders the city streets at night and spies on three sisters talking: the elder wants to marry the king's cook; the middle one the king's butler; and the youngest the king himself, and bear him two sons and a daughter "of beautiful complexion". The king takes them to his court the next morning, and fulills their marriage wishes. Jealous of their sister's good fortune, the queen's sisters replace the royal children (two golden-haired boys and a girl, born in consecutive years) for animals and throw them in the water. The children are saved by the king's gardener, and, years later, they are sent for a talking bird that knows the future, the golden coloured water and a tree that produces melodies when wind rustles its leaves.

In another tale from Jammu, also collected by Mayeda and Brown as a variant of The Slandered Queen, a king has three wives, and no son yet. One day, the oldest co-wife announces she is pregnant, to the jealousy of the other two, who conspire to take the child and son as they are born and cast them in the water. The child's two brothers, bron in the next years, are also cast in the water. All three are saved by a man who was fishing, and are raised by a wise man. Years later, they live a comfortable house with a beautiful garden. One day, the king passes by their garden and compliments it, but says it lacks the golden water and the celestial bird. The two brothers go on a quest for these two items, but fail and are turned into marble statues; their sister finishes the quest, saves them, and brings the objects home.

Mayeda and Brown summarized a tale collected by Jit Kour: a king has seven wifes and no son yet. He decides to travel around until he stops by a house where maidens are talking among themselves, and the most beautiful of them states an astrologer predicted her future: she is to bear "two handsome boys" and "a lovely daughter". The king takes her as his eighth wife, to the chagrin of the other seven wifes, who conspite to degrade her: as soon as the children are born (in three consecutive pregnancies), the queens take the children and cast them in the river, replacing them for monkeys. The children are saved and raised by a fisherman. Years later, an old woman visits the siblings' house and tells them to seek a sparrow that can talk. The brothers fail, but their sister takes the bird and sprinkles holy water to restore them to life. The sparrow then reveals the truth to the king during a banquet.

Cycle of reincarnations
Bengali folklorist Saratchandra Mitra published a tale from the Ho people, "of the wicked queens type": a raja is married to 7 ranis, but has not yet fathered a son. A bramahna tells him to take a stick and beat a tree for 7 mangoes and to give the fruits to his 7 wives. They eat the fruit, but the seventh eats a partly eaten fruit and gives birth to a "beautiful boy with the face of a mongoose". The other queens replace the boy for a stone and a broom, and later in the story his six half-brothers kill and bury him. A bamboo and a shrub with a beautiful flower sprout. The raja plucks the flower and cuts down the bamboo, and his son reappears.

Indian ethnographer Sarat Chandra Roy collected and a published a tale from the Birhor people. In this tale, titled How the dead and buried children of the Raja were restored to life, a childless rajah is married to seven ranis, but has no son. A brahman advises him to strike a mango tree with his sword, get as many mangoes as he can and give to his seven wives. He does that, but manages to get one. Six of the ranis eat the fruit and leave the rind to the seventh. The ones that ate the fuirt bear no son, while the seventh becomes pregnant. The king gives her two drums to announce the child's birth: golden for a boy, silver for a girl. She gives birth to twins, a boy and a girl, who are replaced for a broom and a piece of burnt firewood. The twins are thrown in a pit and found by pot-makers, who raise them as their children. Years later, the six ranis notice that the children are alive and give them poisoned bread. The twins eat, die and are buried by the potmakers in the jungle. From the boy's grave, a plantain tree sprouts, and from the girl's a pinjār tree. One day, a king's woodsman tries to pluck a flower from the pinjar tree, but both it and the plaintain extend their trunks. The woodsman reports to the king, who goes to the trees and tries to pluck the flower. The same event happens. The king summons his six queens, who also fail to get the flower. The rajah summons the seventh queen, who tries to get the flower and both trees return to human form. The rajah learns of the co-wives' deceit and buries them alive in a hole.

In another tale from the Ho people, published by Sukumar Haidar with the title The Trials of a Rani, a childless Raja with three wives is visited by a Brahman, who advises him to get a mango from a mango tree and give it to his three wives. Two of them eat the fruit, while  the third rani eats the skin and the stone. The latter is the only one to bear a son to the king. The other two ranis, jealous of the luck of the other co-wive and replace the boy for a piece of wood, while dropping the boy in a clay pit next to a lake from where potters take clay from. The Raja sees the piece of wood and banishes his third queen. Meanwhile, the third queen's son crawls out of the pit and falls into the lake, becoming a lotus flower (Kamal-bā). The gardener's wife sees the lotus flowers and tries to get it, but it floats away in the lake. Some time later, the ranis try to get the lotus, but the flower questions them about their misdeed. The Raja himself tries next, but the lotus flower floats away. Lastly, the banished queen goes to retrieve the flower. Jets of milk escape from her breasts and shoot at the flower, which moves closer and closer to the shore of the lake. The lotus flower turns back into a human boy and the Raja discovers the ruse.

In another tale from Simla, The Real Mother, a Rajah has seven wives, six who dwell in the palace and the seventh who dwells in a poor mud hut, but has no son. The Rajah meets a fakir, who orders him to shake up a tree, gather however many mangoes fall, and give them to his ranees. The rajah follows the instructions and give the fruits to the six ranees, but forgets his seventh wife. The poor ranee asks a servant to bring her the mango husks, eats them and becomes pregnant. She gives birth to six sons and one daughter, but the other ranees blindfold her eyes, take the children and cast them in a potter's field to die. The potter finds the children and raises them. The six ranees learn of this and send an old midwife to give the children chappatis laced with poison. The children eat the chappatis and die, but the Fakir resurrects them with his own blood. The six ranees send the midwife again to poision the children. They die again, and the Fakir orders the potter to dig eight graves, for the children and him. After they are buried, a mango tree sprouts on each brother's grave, a rose tree on the girl's and a chumpa tree on the Fakir. One day, the Rajah's servants try to pluck the roses from the tree, but a voice from the fakir's grave warns that it is only for their mother. The Rajah goes to the graves and tries to pluck the flowers, and the same voice warns hem. He brings the six ranees to try to pluck them, but to no avail. Lastly, the poor ranee is brought to the trees, and the rose branches spread to cover her with flowers. The Fakir rises from his grave with the seven children and tells their story.

Verrier Elwin collected a tale titled The Jealous Queens, from a Dora-Kurk source in Kaknar, Bastar State. In this tale, a Rani has three children, a son and two daughters. The boy proclaims he wants to marry his sisters. To avoid such a wedding, their mother arranges the boy's marriage to another woman. Even so, he insists he will marry his sisters. Both girls escape to the woods. They beg to a sarai tree to lower its branches for them to climb, then to lead them to a nearby lake to drink water. However, the lake has dried up, so the younger of the two sisters throws her ring in the lake to fill it with water. She then asks her elder sister to get the ring for her. The elder sister dives into the lake and bring the ring to her, but drowns in the process. The girl is now all alone. Some time later, a Raja goes to the lake to shoot some birds and finds the girl atop a mango tree. The Raja takes her as his seventh Rani, since his other six wives haven't born him a son. The seventh queen becomes pregnant and the Rajah gives her a flute of sorrow and a flute of joy to announce the birth of the royal heir. The six cowives blindfold the girl, take the boy as son as he is born and throw him with cord and placenta in the lake, and announce she gave birth to a broom. Deep in the lake, the boy is rescued by his mother's elder sisters, and his placenta becomes a flower on the surface of the lake. A Brahmin sees the flower and tries to get it, but it retreats to the middl of the lake. The Brahmin teels the Raja. The Raja Saheb, Kuar Saheb and Diwan Saheb go to the lake to get the flower. The boy asks his aunt underwater, who tells him to only give the flower to his mother. The six ranies come and try to get it. Lastly, the seventh rani, who was expelled from the palace, is bathed and brought to the lake. She asks the boy to give her the chapa flower, the dondera flower. The boy comes with the flowers and sits on the rani's lap. The Raja begs for an explanation and the boy reveals she is his mother, the Raja is his father and the six cowives have tried to get rid of him. The Raja asks the boy to come live with him. The boy declines, so the Raja kills the six ranis.

In a Dogri tale titled A Fragrant Flower, a king has seven queens, the youngest of which he favours the best, and still no son, so he prays and worships. One day, his pleas are answered, and the youngest queen is pregnant, to the dismay of the other co-wives. The king gives the queen a drum for her to beat whenever she needs something. However, the jealous co-queens trick their rival into beating the drum many times to annoy their husband and leave her on her own at labour. When the time comes, the seventh queen gives birth to twins, a prince and a princess, who are replaced by rats, hidden in a earthen pot and burtied under a pot of dung. The king returns and, seeing the animals, banishes the young queen to the menial position of scaring crows. Meanwhile, on the dung heap, two trees sprout: a mango tree (representing the boy) and a bush of chameli flowers (representing the girl). Sometime later, the king's sepoys see beautiful chameli flowers on the bush and try to pluck them, but, on the advice of the mango tree, the bush rises its height. The sepoys inform the old vizier, who comes to the dunghill to try and pluck the flowers, but the same thing happens. Next, the king himself comes to take the chameli flowers, but the tree rises even higher. Finally, the disgraced junior queen comes to the trees; they embrace the woman and ask her to be dug out of the dunghill. The twins are rescued from the dunghill, still alive; the king then restores the junior queen to her rightful place.

In a Kol tale titled Die Zwillinge ("The Twins"), a king has seven wives. One day, the seventh wife gives birth to a boy and a girl, who are taken by the jealous co-queens and cast in a clay pit, while they replace them for a stone and a broom. A clay potter finds the children and raises them. Years later, he fashions a clay horse for the boy and a clay bird for the girl. The children play with their toys next to a pool where the co-queens are bathing and try to have their toys drink water. The co-queens tease the twins about their strange play, and they retort so is strange for a woman to give birth to a stone and a broom. The co-queens realize the children are their rival's twins, and, feigning illness, ask for their blood. The king then kills the children and bury them; from their graves, a vine sprouts with beautiful flowers. Some time later, the co-queens try to pluck the flowers, but the vine rises its height. Next, the king tries to pluck them, and the children come out alive of the vine and sit on the king's lap.

In a tale collected by author Prafulla Mohanti with the title The Seven Sisters, a Brahmin lives in poverty with his wife and their seven daughters, and begs for alms for a living. One day, the Brahmin's wife prepares cakes for her and him, but their daughters eat the food. That same night, the Brahmin and his wife decide to abandon the girls in the forest since they can afford to support a family of nine. With an excuse to take the girls to their maternal uncle's house, the Brahmin takes them through the woods and gives each of them a bag of rice. After the girls are distracted, the man makes his way back home, and leaves the girls to their fates. Realizing they have been abandoned by their parents and that there isn't much food in the bags, the girls take refuge on a treetop. Some time later, a passing king feels a drop of water falling from the tree and look up; he notices the seven girls and orders them to climb down the tree. He inquires each about their skills: the first promises to feed the whole court with a pot of rice; the other that they can make delicious cakes and curry; finally, the seventh promises to bear "seven handsome sons and a beautiful daughter". The king chooses the seventh sister as his wife and marries her. When she is pregnant, he gives her a flute to blow if there is something she needs; on her sisters' goading, she blows on the flute many times, which irritates the king. She then gives birth to her promised eight children, whom are taken from her by her sisters and replaced for wooden dolls. The sisters bury the children in a dung heap, but they are found by a dog and takes to a lake where a Goddess of Waters live. The goddess raises the children and gives them wooden horses to play with. They then play before the king's gardener, trying to make them drink water, and the latter questions the purpose of their playtime, since a wooden being cannot drink. The children retort that so is a human woman giving birth to wooden images. Later, the Goddess of Water turns the boys into seven trees and the girl into a flower bush. The gardener, the king's minister and the king himself try to pluck their flowers, but the trees rise their branches out of their reach. Lastly, when the disgraced queen, banished to the stables, come to fetch the flowers. The trees approach the queen and the children come out of it. The king learns of his sisters-in-law's ruse and punishes them.

Birth of multiple children
Another Indian tale, Truth's Triumph or Der Sieg der Wahrheit, follows a family saga, being a tale of certain complexity and extension. In the first part of the tale, a childless Rajah with twelve co-wives sees a bringal tree with no leaves but with 101 bringal fruits. His Wuzeer interprets the sight as a portent: whoever marries the daughter of the Malee who tends the garden, shall father 100 sons and a daughter. The rajah marries the Malee's daughter, Guzra Bai. The girl's humble origins spark the jealousy of the twelve co-wives, who take the 101 children and abandon them in the wilderness. In the second part of the tale, the youngest child, a girl, witnesses her brothers' transformation into crows, but she is eventually found and marries a Rajah of a neighboring region. Her child, the prince, learns of his family history and ventures on a quest to reverse his uncles' transformation. At the climax of the story, the boy invites his grandfather and his co-wives and reveals the whole plot, as the family reunites.

In a tale collected from the Muria people in Kanhargaon, Bastar State, by Verrier Elwin with the title The Nine Scores and One Babies, a Raja with seven wives hasn't fathered a son. One day, a beggar and his wife appear at the palace to beg for alms. The Raja dismisses the man, but lets the beggar woman stay. After some months, the woman is pregnant with child, and the Raja gives her a flute of sorrow and a flute of joy, to blow if she ever need his presence. The beggar woman blows on both flutes to test it, but the Raja becomes annoyed and promises not to get back to her. The other queens seize the opportunity to blindfold the beggar woman while she delivers her children: nine scores of boys and a girl. The queens replace them for a grindstone and cast them with the buffaloes, which suckle the children. The seven queens go to the buffalo shed and notice that the children still live, so they get the children and throw them in the bottom of a well in a Marar's garden. The Marar couple finds the children and adopt them. Years later, when the children grow up, the seven queens look for them to give them a cursed piece of bread, which turns them into monkeys. The boys' sister goes with them to live in the jungle. One day, a hunter finds the girl in the jungle and wants to marry her. The girl refuses, but the hunter promises to turn the brothers back into humans. The hunter fulfills his promise and marries the girl, while her brothers, now back into humans, decide to seek employment elsewhere. They steal for a living, which attracts the attention of the Raja, their father. They are arrested and confront the Raja with the truth of their story. The Raja orders the beggar woman to be brought to them, and for a screen to be put between the beggar woman and the boys. Jets of stream flow from her breasts to the boys' mouths, confirming their parentage.

Other variants
Indian scholar A. K. Ramanujan demonstrated the existence of two markedly different modes of storytelling regarding a South Indian variant of the tale type. One way of narration (which he called "domestic") skips the preamble and is more basic and to the point; the second mode ("bardic") is accompanied by instruments and offers a more elaborate tale: the story about king Chadurangaraja who, despite being married to five queens, never had a son, so he goes on a journey in search of a new queen, and finds a maiden named Kadasiddamma in a temple.

In a variant from Salsette Island, Bapkhadî, the Salsette Cinderella, in the second part of the tale, after Bapkhadî marries the prince, she announces that a miraculous event shall happen when she gives birth: if to a boy, "a shower of gold" [golden water] shall appear; if to a girl, "a shower of silver" [silver water]. Everytime she gives birth (to two boys and a girl), the events happen and the king, on a trip, returns home to see his newborn children, but the queen's sisters have taken the children and replace them with animals. The princess Bapkhadi is taken to the dungeon. The siblings are rescued by "the hand of the Almighty God" and grow up. They survive by begging and chanting their story, introducing themselves as Brothers Saya from under the saya tree, Brother Ansa from under the ansa tree and Sister Denku from the Church. One day, the prince - their father - and their aunts pass by them and their aunts give their alms, but the children refuse. The prince is puzzled at the children's behaviour, and they explain that, after they take Bapkhadi out of the dungeon and prepare seven thick curtains, the truth will be revealed. The prince follows with the instructions: behind the heavy curtains, jets of milk stream from Bapkhadi's breasts and into the children's mouth, thus proving their biological connection.

Elwin collected a tale from the Pando people, in the Korba Zamindari, with the title The Raja of Kakarpur: the raja of Kakarpur is already married to six wives, but has yet to father a son. One day, he goes near a tank of water where the princess of Mahuapurgarh and six companion arrive to bathe. The seven girls play in the water and comment with one another what is prophesied for each of them: the princess, the seventh to speak, tells the others her fate is to be the seventh wife to a man and bear him "a son who would shine as brightly as the rays of the sun". He takes the princess by force to his kingdom and marries her. When the fabled boy is born to her, with skin shining as the light, the six other queens become very angry and refuse to talk to their husband unless he banishes the seventh queen from the palace with her son. The boy and his mother are banished to the jungle; the boy eventually separates from his mother and is reared by a sow, a she-dog and a mare. The six queens notice the boy is alive and, to torture him, feign illness and lie to the king that they need the liver of the sow and the she-dog. The mare escapes with the boy to the city of Bhuiharra, where he finds work as a potter's apprentice. During the Ekti festival, the princess and aher twenty handmaidens try to buy some red coloured pots from the boy, now a youth, but he says they are not ready. So he paints the 21 pots with a red paint made with red earth and his urine. The 21 girls drink water from the pot and become pregnant and give birth to a son each. The princess's father organizes a paternity test wherein the sons are to identify their father from all men in the realm. The children indicate the potter as their father, and he tells his life story to the king of Bhuiharra.

In a tale collected from the Santal people, Raj ar eae go̯ṭẹn rạni reaṅ ("A King and his Seven Wives"), a king marries seven wives, wanting to have a child, but no such luck. Then, "Father Isor of Heaven", under the guise of a "Gosse", instructs him to go to his own mango grove and find a tree with seven mangoes and give them to his wives, with the promise that the king give him, the Gosse, his firstborn. The first six wives eat their mangoes and the fruit reserved to the youngest wife. However, she gets the mango rind and eats, becoming pregnant before the other wives. The king arranges the preparations for the birth of his child: the queen shall ring a deep-sounding bell for a boy, and a tiny-sounding bell for a girl. The queen gives birth to twins, a boy and a girl (both bells were sounded), but the other jealous co-wives, out of envy, replace the children for two worn-out brooms. The twins are found and raised by a potter and his wife. The truth is revealed when the Gosse goes to the palace to cash in his promise and tells the king none of the children of the other six queens are his firstborn. The tale later continues with the adventures of the seven half-brothers.

In a Gujarati tale published by author Tara Bose with the title The Story of the Twins, king Vijaypal of Gujarat has six wives, but no child yet. His ministers recommend he marries a poor, but beautiful woman named Suman as his seventh wife. Suman becomes pregnant and gives birth to twins, a boy and a girl, who are taken by the other six queens and replaced for pups. The twins are cast in a wooden box in the Shetrunji River and are saved by a hermit. The hermit names the boy Dilaram and the girl Chandrika and raises them as his children. On his deathbed, the hermit gives the twins a magical pot and two rubies. After their adoptive father dies, they rub the rubies against each other and two fairies appear. They wish for the fairies to take them to the land of their birth, Paran. Once there, they build a palace for themselves and Dilaram invites the king and every citizen in the realm for a feast. After the feast, the king takes an interest in the twins' past and orders his ministers to ask around. The ministers find a former midwife named Champa, who looked after queen Suman until the twins' delivery. The king learns the truth, embraces Dilaram as his heir and reinstates Suman as his queen.

In a Tamil tale from Madurai district, a raja is despondent for not having a son, so he remarries four times. His newest wife is pregnant, and he goes away on a hunt. She gives birth to seven children, the eldest a girl, but the other cowives replace them with insects and cockroaches, and abandoned in a garbage heap. The children are raised by a rat, who tells them to find some food in the palace. The cowives see them and order the rat to be killed. The rat takes the children to the temple of Kali and resigns to her death. The goddess Kali raises the children, until the cowives order Kali to be killed and her blood used to cure her headaches. Kali delivers the children to a snake foster mother named Nagamma. Later, Nagamma takes the children to a Gasnesa temple and they are raised there until they are ten years old. At the climax of the tale, the eldest sister decides to return home and confront her father and the cowives. She summons a panchayat and presents her case as a story in front of the assembly of people.

In a tale from Tripura with the title The Khumpai flower, in a village in Tripura, an Acai (priest) has two daughters. Both daughters go to the jum field and eat food at noon. One day, the sky becomes overcast with storm clouds. Fearing for their lives, the elder sister promises to marry whoever helps them. A snake appears and builds them a shelter, then vanishes into the jungle. The two sisters take shelter and wait for the storm to pass, then return home. The next day, the elder sister chooses to remain true to her word, and her younger sister invites the snake to share their food. This goes on for some time, until their parents notice the girls looking slimmer and discover the incident. The father goes with the younger sister and kills the snake. The next time both sisters go to meet the snake, the elder finds out that  the snake was killed and follows its usual path to a precipice. She finds  the head of the dead snake and a Khumpai flower nearby. As she stands near the flower, a gush of water begins to flood a waterfall and drowns the elder sister - forming the Gomati river. As the elder sister drowns, she tells her younger sister not to cry over her, since the snake was a god; and she advises her to wander to a crossing of seven paths, climb a banyan tree with a loom on top, and proclaims she will become queen. The younger sister goes to the seven paths, finds a golden loom inside and earns her living by spinning, weaving and selling her exquisite designs. One day, Raja Subrai of Tripura announces he will marry the girl whose clothe will be judged excellent. Many candidates try, but in the end the king chooses the "lady of the tree" (the younger sister) as his new queen. The girl cries tears of joy and creates the Haora river. Raja Subrai is already married to other queens. When the newest queen gives birth to their children (in seven consecutive pregnancies), the co-queens replace the children for animals (the first son for a toad) and cast them in the Gomati river. Raja Subrai, tricked by the jealous queens, exile her from the palace. As for the children, the seven brothers are rescued by their aunt and raised in the river. After some time, the seven brothers decide to take revenge on the queens: they go to a ghàt and break the jars of the queens' maidservants. As soon as he situation escalates, the king and a crowd assemble to solve the altercation. The exiled queen is brough to them and the seven brothers leave the river castle to embrace their parents, and the co-queens are executed.

Adaptations
The folktale was adapted into a graphic novel by Indian publisher Amar Chitra Katha, in 1979, with the name Chandralalat, the Prince with a moon on his forehead.

The 1979 Indian Bengali-language film Arun Barun O Kiranmala was also based on this folktale.

See also
 Fire Boy (Japanese folktale)
 The Magician's Horse
 Thakurmar Jhuli, collection of Bengali folktales
 The Turtle Prince (folktale)

Footnotes

References 

Indian fairy tales
Fictional princes
Indian literature
Bengali folklore
ATU 700-749